The Sri Ganesha Temple of Alaska is a Hindu temple in Anchorage, Alaska. Inaugurated in 1999, it is the first Hindu temple in Alaska. Its main deity is Ganesha. The temple also has the sacred images of Durga and Rama.

History
In 1995, a group of local Hindus started worshipping together informally in Downtown Anchorage. American Hindu leader Sivaya Subramuniyaswami donated a Ganesha murti to the group, and on June 25, 1999, formally established the Sri Ganesha Mandir in rented space in the Anchorage Church Of Religious Science. 
During the inauguration, local Inuit spiritual leaders and elders blessed the congregation with songs, chants, and drumming. Approximately forty Hindu pilgrims from outside the area also attended the event.

In 2002, the temple moved to a temporary location on Blueberry Road. With donations from the local Hindu community and local construction magnate Jerry Neeser, in 2003 it purchased a property on Raspberry Road to become the temple's permanent home. The property was renovated, and several murtis were installed. The temple moved to and opened at its new location in 2011.

References

Hindu temples in Alaska
Buildings and structures in Anchorage, Alaska
Hinduism in the United States
Religious buildings and structures completed in 2011
Religious organizations established in 2000
2000 establishments in Alaska
Asian-American culture in Alaska
Indian-American culture in Alaska